The debate on the "Chineseness" of the Yuan and Qing dynasties is concerned with whether the Mongol-led Yuan dynasty (1271–1368) and the Manchu-led Qing dynasty (1636–1912) can be considered "Chinese dynasties", and whether they were representative of "China" during the respective historical periods. The debate, albeit historiographical in nature, has political implications. Mainstream academia and successive governments of China, including the imperial governments of the Yuan and Qing dynasties, have maintained the view that they were "Chinese" and representative of "China". In short, the cause of the controversy stems from the dispute in interpreting the relationship between the two concepts of "Han Chinese" and "China", because although the Chinese government recognizes 56 ethnic groups in China and the Han have a more open view of the Yuan and Qing dynasties since Liang Qichao and other royalist reformers supported the Qing dynasty, the Han are China's main ethnic group. This means that there are many opinions that equate Han Chinese people with China and lead to criticism of the legitimacy of these two dynasties.

Background

Origin and development
This debate emerged following the Meiji Restoration in Japan. In their attempt to rationalize the debate, some Japanese scholars deliberately conflated the concepts of "China" and "China proper", in the process diminishing the scope of the former. The position that the Yuan and Qing dynasties were "non-Chinese" was later adopted by some late-Qing anti-Manchu Chinese revolutionaries who had lived in Japan. Zhang Binglin, for instance, in a work titled On the Chinese Republic, proposed that a potential Chinese republican state to be founded in the event of a Qing collapse should only comprise regions influenced by Han culture, and that non-Han regions were outside of "China".

Furthermore, to serve Japanese political agenda, some Japanese academics and politicians like Yano Jinichi and Ishiwara Kanji made a distinction between "China" and the "Qing dynasty"; and separated Manchuria, Inner Mongolia, and Outer Mongolia from the territorial scope of "China" in their rhetoric to jusify the Continental Policy and the Japanese invasion of China.

Political significance
Whereas there were many regimes in Chinese history that were ruled by non-Han ethnicities, the Yuan and Qing dynasties were the only two that ultimately achieved the unification of China proper. The Qing dynasty, in particular, is noted for having laid the foundation for the modern-day territories of China. Both the People's Republic of China and the Republic of China base their constitutional territorial claims on those of the Qing dynasty, in accordance with the succession of states theory. Denying the "Chineseness" of the Yuan and Qing dynasties thus threatens the territorial integrity of contemporary China. To protect Chinese national and traditional historiographical interests, Chinese historians and governments have rejected the opinion that the Yuan and Qing dynasties were "non-Chinese".

Opposing positions

Yuan and Qing as "non-Chinese" dynasties

Proponents of the view that the Yuan and Qing dynasties were "non-Chinese" or "foreign" generally equate "Chinese people" with Han people, and "China" with the Han-dominated region of China proper. Emphasis is often given to the fact that both regimes and those who founded them did not originate from the Central Plain, the cradle of Chinese civilization and the heartland of the ethnic Han. Furthermore, the rulers were ethnic minorities, whom the dominant Han people traditionally considered "barbarians", according to the Hua–Yi dichotomy. Thus, during these periods "China" should be perceived as a "colony" of the Mongols and Manchus respectively. By extension, the lands controlled by the Yuan and Qing dynasties, particularly those inhabited by significant non-Han populations, should not be regarded as historical Chinese territories.

Currently, the position is supported by the Central Tibetan Administration, Uyghur separatists, Mongolian nationalists, the extreme part of Han Chinese nationalists, some Western scholars, most of the anti-Chinese movements, and far-right Japanese historians. Some extremists think that the Red Turban Rebellions (against Yuan) and the Revolution of 1911 (against Qing) are just two uprisings to liberate China (from "non-Chinese").

Yuan and Qing as "Chinese" dynasties

Scholars who uphold the view that both dynasties were "Chinese" find fault with the opposing group's narrow conception of "China" and "Chinese" in cultural, ethnic, and political terms. These scholars posit that "China" and "Chinese" should be best understood as multicultural and multiethnic concepts that transcend the ideological boundaries of contemporary ethnic nationalism. Liang Qichao, for instance, argued that "macro-nationalism" with its emphasis on a multicultural and multiethnic China could best explain the historical trajectories of China, as opposed to "micro-nationalism" that foregrounded the Han people at the expense of ethnic minorities. These scholars also criticize the opposing group for retroactively applying modern-day ideologies such as ethnic nationalism to historical peoples and regimes, resulting in distorted narratives.

The imperial governments of the Yuan and Qing dynasties maintained the view that their regimes were orthodox dynasties of China. In the Ultimatum from the Mongol State issued to the Emperor Kameyama of Japan in 1266, the Emperor Shizu of Yuan referred to the Mongol Empire using various traditional names of China. In 1271, the Emperor Shizu of Yuan issued the Edict on the Proclamation of the Dynastic Name, which formally claimed succession from prior Chinese regimes, from the Three Sovereigns and Five Emperors to the Tang dynasty, for the entire Mongol-ruled realm and equated the Mongol Empire with the Yuan dynasty. The edict of enthronement of the Emperor Chengzong of Yuan proclaimed that Genghis Khan received the Mandate of Heaven and went on to "establish China (Quxia)"—a traditional Chinese expression referring to the founding of a Chinese dynasty. As evident from the Chinese seal bestowed by the Emperor Chengzong of Yuan to Öljaitü of the Ilkhanate, seen in a letter by Öljaitü to Philip IV of France dated 1305, the Yuan dynasty officially saw itself as possessing the Mandate of Heaven in the traditional Chinese style. Released in 1307 by the Emperor Wuzong of Yuan, the edict establishing the Zhida era began with a statement celebrating the Yuan dynasty's "unification of China (Huaxia)". During the reign of the Emperor Huizong of Yuan, he commissioned the History of Liao, the History of Song, and the History of Jin—a policy in line with Chinese historiographical tradition which reflected the Yuan dynasty's self-conception as a legitimate successor state to the earlier Liao, Song, and Jin dynasties. The History of Jin, in particular, defined Genghis Khan as a Chinese monarch, in the same vein as the Emperor Gao of Han and the Emperor Taizong of Tang. The Southern Song dynasty, before its eventual conquest by the Yuan dynasty, regarded the Yuan dynasty as the "northern dynasty" of a divided China. The Hongwu Emperor of the Ming dynasty, who overthrew the Yuan dynasty, accepted the Yuan dynasty as an orthodox Chinese dynasty and ordered the compilation of the History of Yuan to reflect this view.

Similarly, emperors of the Qing dynasty officially equated their empire with "China" and adopted "Dulimbai Gurun", Manchu for "Zhongguo" (Middle Kingdom), as a name for the state. The Qing dynasty was formally conceived as a multiethnic empire and its emperors openly rejected the idea that "Chinese" and "China" only referred to the Han people and the lands that they populated, respectively. In 1711, the Kangxi Emperor publicly proclaimed that the Manchu homeland of Manchuria was part of the "land of China (Zhongguo)". The Records of Great Righteousness Resolving Confusion issued by the Yongzheng Emperor ridiculed and objected to narratives that depicted the Qing dynasty as "non-Chinese" and "foreign". In official Qing parlance, "Chinese languages" (Dulimbai gurun-i bithe) included Mandarin, Manchu, and Mongolian; while "Chinese people" referred to all subjects of the Qing dynasty, regardless of their ethnicity. When the Qing dynasty annexed Dzungaria in 1759, it was officially proclaimed that the region was "absorbed into China (Dulimbai Gurun)" in a Manchu-language memorial. In addition, terms such as "China", the "Chinese Empire", and the "Empire of China" were used as synonyms for the Qing dynasty in international treaties. For example, the Manchu-language version of the Convention of Kyakhta signed in 1768 with the Russian Empire referred to subjects of the Qing dynasty as "people from the Central Kingdom (Dulimbai Gurun)". Likewise, the Manchu–Mongolian–Chinese Interlinear Trilingual Textbook published by the Qing imperial government also referred to the Qing dynasty as "China" (Zhongguo) and claimed the empire as part of the 5000-year-old Chinese civilization. Like its Yuan predecessor, the Qing dynasty also composed the History of Ming to reflect its position as the orthodox successor to the Ming dynasty. A manifestation of the Qing dynasty's self-conception as a legitimate dynasty of China, Qing emperors periodically carried out imperial worships at the Temple of Monarchs of Successive Dynasties in Beijing, where the spiritual tablets of earlier Chinese rulers and officials of both Han and non-Han ethnic origins, including those of the Mongol Empire and Yuan dynasty, were situated. In deciding the list of worshipped individuals, the Qianlong Emperor promoted the idea that the "succession of Chinese (Zhonghua) monarchs" should be understood as an "unbroken lineage reminiscent of a thread", regardless of the ethnicity of the rulers. In 1912, in the name of the Xuantong Emperor, the Empress Xiaodingjing issued the Imperial Edict of the Abdication of the Qing Emperor, which provided the legal basis for the Republic of China to inherit all Qing territories and be considered as the sole rightful successor to the Qing dynasty, while simultaneously reaffirming that both the Manchus and Mongols belonged to the Chinese nation.

From the perspective of ethnicity, it was common for monarchs of China to possess mixed heritage, including those of the Yuan and Qing dynasties. For example, the Kangxi Emperor of the Qing dynasty was of mixed Manchu and Han descent, having derived his Han ancestry from his mother, the Empress Xiaokangzhang. Therefore, the "non-Han" nature of many such dynasties should not be regarded as absolute, even though there was still ethnic discrimination in these dynasties. 

The view that both dynasties were "non-Chinese" is rejected by mainstream academia, as well as the governments of the People's Republic of China and the Republic of China. The Historical Atlas of China, one of the most authoritative works on Chinese historical geography, considered both dynasties to be "Chinese" alongside other polities ruled by non-Han ethnicities. As part of their efforts to maintain Chinese historiographical tradition and make known the official position regarding the nature of the Yuan and Qing dynasties, the Republic of China has published the New History of Yuan, the Draft History of Qing, and the History of Qing; whereas the People's Republic of China has also commissioned its version of the History of Qing.

See also
 Chinese historiography
 Han nationalism
 Han chauvinism
 Conquest dynasty
 New Qing History
 Chinese nationalism
 Five Races Under One Union
 Zhonghua minzu
 Civilization state
 Sinicization
 Ethnic groups in Chinese history
 Northern Yuan
 Later Jin (1616–1636)
 Tibetan sovereignty debate

References

Works cited

 
 
 
 

Controversies in China
Historical controversies
Historiography of China
Chinese nationalism
Yuan dynasty
Qing dynasty